Thomas Flynn  VC (August 1842 – 10 August 1892) was born in Athlone and was an Irish recipient of the Victoria Cross, the highest and most prestigious award for gallantry in the face of the enemy that can be awarded to British and Commonwealth forces.

Victoria Cross
Flynn is acknowledged to be one of the two youngest recipients of the Victoria Cross; both he and Andrew Fitzgibbon were 15 years and three months old.
His exact date of birth is unknown, but he was 15 years old, and a drummer in the 64th Regiment of Foot (later The North Staffordshire Regiment – The Prince of Wales's), British Army during the Indian Mutiny when the following deed took place on 28 November 1857 at Cawnpore, India, for which he was awarded the Victoria Cross:
Drummer Thomas Flynn
Date of Act of Bravery, 28th November, 1857
For conspicuous gallantry, in the charge on the Enemy's guns on the 28th November, 1857, when, being himself wounded, he engaged in a hand to hand encounter two of the Rebel Artillerymen.

Post-army life
After he left the army, he fell on hard times and was sent to Athlone Workhouse. His local Member of Parliament, Donal Sullivan, raised the matter in the House of Commons in April 1892. After reference to Flynn's previous gallantry, Sullivan asked the Financial Secretary to the War Office St John Brodrick:

Brodrick replied that:

Flynn died in the workhouse on 10 August 1892.

A memorial plaque was erected in the Garrison Church, Whittington Barracks, Lichfield, Staffordshire.

References

Listed in order of publication year 
The Register of the Victoria Cross (1981, 1988 and 1997)

Ireland's VCs (Dept of Economic Development, 1995)
Monuments to Courage (David Harvey, 1999)
Irish Winners of the Victoria Cross (Richard Doherty & David Truesdale, 2000)

External links
Location of grave and VC medal (Co. Westmeath, Ireland)
Athone Heritage

1842 births
1892 deaths
19th-century Irish people
Irish soldiers in the British Army
People from Athlone
North Staffordshire Regiment soldiers
Irish recipients of the Victoria Cross
Indian Rebellion of 1857 recipients of the Victoria Cross
British military musicians
British Army recipients of the Victoria Cross
Child soldiers
Military personnel from County Westmeath